Boris Petrovitch Babkin FRS, M.D., D.Sc, LL.D (17 January 1877 – 3 May 1950) was a Russian-born physiologist, who worked in Russia, England and Canada.

Career 
Babkin graduated from the Military Medical Academy, St. Petersburg, with a Doctor of Medicine degree in 1904. He held professorships at the Novo-Alexandria Agricultural Institute and the University of Odessa, before being imprisoned and exiled from Russia in 1922, due to his criticism of the October Revolution.

He then spent two years in England, working at University College London under Ernest Starling, before joining Dalhousie University, Nova Scotia, as Professor of Physiology.

In 1928 Babkin became a research professor at McGill University, Montreal, under Prof John Tait, where he spent the remainder of his career.  He chaired the Physiology department between 1940 and 1941, following Tait's retirement, and, following his retirement, was invited to become Research Fellow of Neurosurgery by Wilder Penfield; a position he held until his death in 1950.

In 1950, he was elected a Fellow of the Royal Society for "his work on the digestive glands, conditioned reflexes and the cortical representation of autonomically innervated organs. He demonstrated that a) the three pancreatic enzymes are secreted in parallel, b) sympathetic and parasympathetic fibres innervate different cells in the salivary glands and c) histamine stimulates exclusively gastric parietal cells. His researches not only refuted Heidenhain's theory of "secretory" and "trophic" nerves but led to the conception of the elements of the digestive glands being activated by different nerves and hormones. Author of "Die aussere Sekretion der Verdauungsdrusen" and "Secretory Mechanism of the Digestive Glands""
 His personal papers are conserved at the McGill University Library in the collections of the Osler Library of the History of Medicine and the McGill University Archives.

Honours 

 1904, Doctor of Medicine, Imperial Military Medical Academy
 1924, Honorary Doctor of Science, University College London
 1943, Honorary Doctor of Letters, Dalhousie University
 1949, Friedenwald Medal, American Gastroenterological Association
 1950, Fellow of the Royal Society

References 

1877 births
1950 deaths
Physiologists from the Russian Empire
Soviet physiologists
Fellows of the Royal Society
White Russian emigrants to Canada
Canadian people of Russian descent
Soviet emigrants to the United Kingdom
20th-century Russian scientists
S.M. Kirov Military Medical Academy alumni